The 2015 Erie Explosion season was the ninth and final season for the indoor football franchise, and their only season in the Professional Indoor Football League (PIFL).

Schedule
Key:

Regular season
All start times are local to home team

Standings

Roster

References

Erie Explosion seasons
Erie Explosion
Erie Explosion